The FreeBSD Foundation is a United States-based 501(c)(3) registered non-profit organization dedicated to supporting the FreeBSD project, its development and its community.  Funding comes from individual and corporate donations, and is used to sponsor developers for specific activities, purchase hardware and network infrastructure and provide travel grants to developer summits.  The FreeBSD Foundation is able to provide legal representation to sign contracts and agreements on behalf of the FreeBSD project, and also holds the FreeBSD trademark and related domain names.

The FreeBSD Foundation received initial 501(c)(3) charity status on December 7, 2000, and the Foundation was formally announced to the world on June 27, 2001.

Board of Directors 
The current Board of Directors is as follows:

 Justin T. Gibbs, President and Founder
 Benedict Reuschling, Vice President
 Kevin Bowling, Secretary
 Dr. Marshall Kirk McKusick, Treasurer
 Dr. Hiroki Sato, Director
 Andrew Wafaa, Director
 Dr. Robert N. M. Watson, Director

References

External links

 FreeBSD Foundation

Charities based in Colorado
Free software project foundations in the United States
FreeBSD